Asaccus montanus, also known as the Mountain Leaf-toed Gecko is a species of lizard in the family Phyllodactylidae. It is endemic to Oman.

References

Asaccus
Reptiles of the Arabian Peninsula
Endemic fauna of Oman
Reptiles described in 1994